Yefimov, sometimes spelled Efimov, or Yefimova (feminine; Ефимова) is a Russian last name and may refer to:

 Alexander Yefimov (1923–2012), a Soviet aircraft pilot and twice Hero of the Soviet Union
 Boris Efimov (1900–2008), a Soviet political cartoonist and propaganda artist
 Igor Yefimov (1937–2020), an American philosopher, writer, and publisher of Russian origin
 Mikhail Efimov (1881–1919), a Russian aviation pioneer
 2754 Efimov, an asteroid named after Mikhail Efimov
 Mikhail Yefimov (born 1978), Russian football player
 Nikolai Efimov (1910–1982), a Russian mathematician
 Sergei Yefimov (1922–1994), a Soviet army officer and Hero of the Soviet Union
 Sergei Efimov (born 1987), a Russian footballer
 Vitaly Efimov (born 1938), a Russian theoretical physicist
The Efimov state is named after Vitaly Efimov.
 Vitaly Efimov (politician) (born 1940), Russian politician
 Vladimir Yefimov (1949–2012), a Russian type designer, typesetting font artist, theorist and teacher
 Vyacheslav Yefimov (1923–1943), a Soviet army officer and Hero of the Soviet Union

Russian-language surnames